The men's halfpipe competition of the 2013 FIS Snowboarding World Championships was held in Stoneham-et-Tewkesbury, Québec, Canada on January 19 & 20, 2013. 53 athletes from 20 countries competed.

Medalists

Results

Qualification

Semifinal

Final

References

Results

Halfpipe, men's